Niels Erik Nørlund  (26 October 1885, in Slagelse – 4 July 1981, in Copenhagen) was a Danish mathematician.

His book Vorlesungen über Differenzenrechnung (1924, reprinted 1954) was the first book on complex function solutions of difference equations. His doctoral students include Georg Rasch.

The Norlund Alps and Norlund Land in Greenland were named after him.

He was also the brother of Margrethe Nørlund Bohr and brother-in-law of Nobel Prize winning physicist Niels Bohr.

Selected works
 
 with René Lagrange as editor:

See also

 Nörlund–Rice integral
 Inge Lehmann

References

Further reading
Mathematics and Mathematicians: Mathematics in Sweden Before 1950
  Nørlund on Calculus of Differences

20th-century  Danish mathematicians
Foreign Members of the Royal Society
People from Slagelse
1885 births
1981 deaths
Academic staff of the University of Copenhagen
Rectors of the University of Copenhagen